Chinese Service is a 1999 Russian comedy film directed by Vitaly Moskalenko.

Plot 
The film takes place in 1913 on a ship leaving the Volga from Tsaritsyn to Nizhny Novgorod to celebrate the 300th anniversary of the Romanov dynasty. Suddenly it became known that scammers plan to beat poker rich merchant Frol Satanovsky...

Cast 
 Oleg Yankovsky as Count Stroganov
 Anna Samokhina as Zinaida Voloshina
 Vladimir Menshov as Merchant Satanovsky
 Sergey Nikonenko as Arseni Myshko
 Bogdan Stupka as Lapsin
 Sergey Bezrukov as Kolya Sidikhin
 Sergey Gabrielyan
 Irina Bezrukova as Countess (as Irina Livanova)
 Maksim Lagashkin as Waiter
 Andrei Davydov as General

References

External links 
 

1999 films
1990s Russian-language films
Russian historical comedy films
Films set in 1913
Films set in Nizhny Novgorod
Films set in the Russian Empire
Films shot in Nizhny Novgorod
1999 comedy films